Igor Yuryevich Uralyov (born 15 October 1966) is a Russian professional football coach and a former player. He is the goalkeepers' coach with Alania Vladikavkaz.

External links
 

1966 births
Living people
Soviet footballers
Russian footballers
FC Spartak Vladikavkaz players
FC Elista players
PFC Spartak Nalchik players
FC Amkar Perm players
Russian football managers
FC Amkar Perm managers
Russian Premier League managers
FC Oryol players
Association football goalkeepers